Rudolf Meier (born 23 June 1939) is a Swiss boxer. He competed in the men's heavyweight event at the 1964 Summer Olympics. At the 1964 Summer Olympics, he lost to Santiago Lovell Jr. of Argentina.

References

1939 births
Living people
Heavyweight boxers
Swiss male boxers
Olympic boxers of Switzerland
Boxers at the 1964 Summer Olympics
Place of birth missing (living people)